The Gatard Statoplan AG 04 Pigeon was a light utility aircraft developed in France in the 1970s. It was a high-wing strut-braced monoplane with fixed tailwheel undercarriage. The wings could be quickly folded to facilitate storage or towing. As with Gatard's previous Poussin, the Pigeon was built around an unconventional flight control system that relied on varying its wings' camber to provide most of its climb, rather than their angle of attack. A prototype, registered F-WYBB flew in 1976, and although it was intended to market the design to homebuilders, this did not transpire.

Specifications

References
 
 

1970s French civil utility aircraft
Homebuilt aircraft
Gatard aircraft
High-wing aircraft
Single-engined tractor aircraft
Aircraft first flown in 1976